Briquet may refer to:

People named Briquet
 Briquet (possibly Jehan de Villeroye)  , an early Renaissance composer
 Charles-Moïse Briquet (1880-1918), Swiss paper merchant and scholar of watermarks
 Fortunée Briquet (1782–1815), French femme de lettres
 John Briquet (1870-1931) - Swiss botanist
 Paul Briquet (1796-1881), French psychiatrist
 Robert Briquet (14th century), mercenary captain during the Hundred Years' War

Other
 Artois Hound or Briquet, a rare breed of dog, and a descendant of the Bloodhound
 Briquet (coin), a Medieval silver coin
 Briquette or briquet, a block of flammable matter which is used as fuel to start and maintain a fire
 Briquet's, a famous 19th century private school at Plain Palais, Geneva, Switzerland
 Sabre, a sword with a curved, single-edged blade and a rather large hand guard, often carried in past centuries by infantrymen and artillerymen
 A type of sandwich